Established in 2014 in Paris as a subsidiary of ISG Business School, Moda Domani Institute is one of the few business schools in France specialized in luxury, fashion and design.
The business school is a member of the IONIS Education Group, the largest private group in France in terms of student population and endowment.

In UK, the university has a double-degree partnership with the Liverpool John Moores University.

References

External links 
 Moda Domani Institute website

Business schools in France
Educational institutions established in 2014
Education in Paris
2014 establishments in France
Design schools